Ontefetse Kenneth Matambo is a Botswana politician and economist. He served as the minister of finance and economic planning of Botswana from 1 August 2009 until 2019 when he left office.

References 

Living people
Finance ministers of Botswana
Year of birth missing (living people)
Botswana economists